Alfred Velghe (16 June 1870 – 28 February 1904) was a Belgian-French racing driver and cyclist who competed under the pseudonym Levegh.

Biography
On 1 October 1899, Levegh drove a Mors in a race between Bordeaux and Biarritz (232 km) which he won. He participated in the Gordon Bennett Cup car in 1900 and 1901. He also won the 'Large Car' class of the Paris-Toulouse-Paris race, held in 1900 as an unofficial Olympic sport, in 20h 50 '9 ". Velghe's nephew, Pierre Levegh, was also a racing driver.

References

1870 births
1904 deaths
French racing drivers